Vianinae is a subfamily of tropical land snail, a terrestrial gastropod mollusk in the family Helicinidae.

Species 
According to the World Register of Marine Species, the following genera are accepted within Vianinae:

 Calidviana H. B. Baker, 1954
 Calybium Morlet, 1892
 Eutrochatella P. Fischer, 1885
 Geophorus P. Fischer, 1885
 Geotrochatella P. Fischer, 1891
 Heudeia Crosse, 1885
 Lucidella Swainson, 1840
 Priotrochatella H. Fischer, 1893
 Pseudotrochatella  G. Nevill, 1881
 Pyrgodomus  Crosse &P. Fischer, 1894
 Semitrochatella Aguayo & Jaume, 1958
 Swiftella H. B. Baker, 1941
 Troschelviana H. B. Baker, 1922
 Ustronia A. J. Wagner, 1908
 Viana H. Adams & A. Adams, 1856

References

  Bouchet P., Rocroi J.P., Hausdorf B., Kaim A., Kano Y., Nützel A., Parkhaev P., Schrödl M. & Strong E.E. (2017). Revised classification, nomenclator and typification of gastropod and monoplacophoran families. Malacologia. 61(1-2): 1-526

Helicinidae
Gastropods described in 1922